Sidney Sladen (born 17 November 1979) is a fashion designer of Kenyan Origin who also worked as costume designer for many Indian films.

Personal life 
He was born in Kenya but came to Chennai when he was eight years old. At 12 years, he began designing costumes for dolls, whilst also taking up a month's course in the Tamil Nadu Advanced Training Institute. He has also studied Visual communication in Loyola College, Chennai. He then studied fashion designing in Italy. He has a fashion designing studio in Cathedral Road, Chennai.

Work in films 
He made his debut as costume designer for the film Five Star (2002). Some of the films for which he did costume designing include Ice (2003), Chandramukhi (2005), Nenjil Jil Jil (2006) and Silambattam (2008).

References

External links 
 Sidney Sladen on Twitter

Businesspeople from Chennai
Living people
1979 births
Indian male fashion designers
Indian people of Kenyan descent